HMS Eagle was a British 64-gun third-rate ship of the line of the Royal Navy, launched on 2 May 1774 at Rotherhithe.

History

On 7 September 1776, the experimental American submarine , under the guidance of army volunteer Sergeant Ezra Lee, was alleged to have attacked HMS Eagle, which was moored off what is today called Liberty Island, but was unable to bore through the hull. When Lee attempted another spot in the hull, he lost the ship, and eventually abandoned the attempt.

British naval historian Richard Compton-Hall stated that the problems of achieving neutral buoyancy would have rendered the vertical propeller useless. The route Turtle would have had to take to attack HMS Eagle was slightly across the tidal stream which would, in all probability, have resulted in Ezra Lee becoming exhausted having only 20 minutes of air. There is no record of the Royal Navy recording an attack.  In the face of these and other problems Compton-Hall suggests that the Turtle got nowhere near HMS Eagle and the entire story was fabricated as disinformation and morale-boosting propaganda, and that if Ezra Lee did carry out an attack it was in a covered rowing boat rather than Turtle.

Eagle went on to take part in the Battle of Cuddalore in 1783.

Eagle was on harbour service from 1790, and was broken up in 1812.

Notes

References

 Lavery, Brian (2003) The Ship of the Line - Volume 1: The development of the battlefleet 1650-1850. Conway Maritime Press. .

External links
 

Ships of the line of the Royal Navy
Intrepid-class ships of the line
1774 ships